Riaan Liebenberg is a paralympic athlete from South Africa competing mainly in category T13 sprints events.

Riian competed in the 100m, 200m and 400m in the T13 class at the 2000 Summer Paralympics winning a silver medal in the 400m.

References

Paralympic athletes of South Africa
Athletes (track and field) at the 2000 Summer Paralympics
Paralympic silver medalists for South Africa
Afrikaner people
South African people of Dutch descent
South African people of German descent
Living people
Medalists at the 2000 Summer Paralympics
Year of birth missing (living people)
Paralympic medalists in athletics (track and field)
South African male sprinters
20th-century South African people
21st-century South African people
Visually impaired sprinters
Paralympic sprinters